Kolangal(Tamil: கோலங்கள்) was an Indian Tamil-language soap opera which aired on Sun TV. It is a Prime time serial that aired weekdays from 24 November 2003 to 4 December 2009 for 1,533 episodes.  It was the first series in Tamil television history to have crossed 1,000 episodes. The show is aired in Sun TV every Monday to Friday at 7.30 pm and later shifted to 9:00 pm.

The show starred Devayani, Deepa Venkat, V. Thiruselvam, Ajay Kapoor, Poornima Indrajith, While Mohan Sharma, Sathya Priya, Abishek Shankar, Subhalekha Sudhakar, Nalini, Vanitha Krishnachandran, Srividya Mohan, Manjari Vinodhini, Kuyili, Bombay Gnanam, Dwarakish Giri, Auditor Sridhar, Joker Thulasi, Bharathi, Neelima Rani, Devadharshini, Priyadarshini, Dhivyadharshini Supporting Roles & Co Stars. The show was later replaced by Thendral which was also produced by Vikatan Televistas.

After 15 years hiatus, the show started reairing from 26 November 2018 on Vikatan Prime Time YouTube channel. The show is produced by Vikatan Televistas and directed by V. Thiruselvam. The title track was composed by D. Imman and sung by Harini. It was also aired in Tamil on Sri Lanka's Shakthi TV and United Kingdom's Tharisanam TV. It is currently re-telecasting in Colors Tamil from May 16, 2022 at 01:00PM.

Plot
The story mainly talks about Abi and her life which changes due to the people around her.

Abi, a hard-working, ambitious woman with strong beliefs and her business rival and half brother, Aditya. Abi with her mother, Karpagam maternal uncle, two sisters, Anandhi and Aarthi and brother, Manohar leads a healthy life though she tries to keep herself happy because she had a dark past.

Her father had abandoned her family and married another woman, Kanchana, the mother of Aditya, and has settled as a business tycoon. Abi initially marries Bhaskar but the relationship becomes abusive. Her mother-in-law, Alamelu tortures her constantly.

Eventually, Aadhi lures all Abi's close family members and turns all her family members are against her.

Abi divorces her husband and starts a new life. She starts a new company but is given competition by her stepbrother Aditya Eeswaramoorthy whom he considers as her as sworn rival. Abi escapes from her brother's tortures and puts an end to his injustice.

In the last scene, Abi with the help of her good friend Tholkappiyan leads a peaceful and hermit life.  Abi starts to help an orphanage, thereby ending what she couldn't do to help herself, and wishes to be dear among the orphans even though they are not known to them. She leads a victorious life with the help of 2 friends, Tholkappiyan (Thols) and Usha, Aadhi's ex-wife.

Cast

Main cast
Devayani as Abinaya "Abi": (Baskar's ex-wife. Tholkappian and Usha's best friend. Eshwaramoorthy and Karpagam's eldest daughter. Anandhi, Manohar and Aarthi's eldest sister. Adhithya, Arjun and Anjali's elder step-sister and MD of Abi Constructions) (01-1533)
Deepa Venkat as Usha (Abi and Tholkappiyan's best friend/wellwisher, Kailash's mother and Aadhi's wife) (01-1533)
V. Thiruselvam as Tholkappiyan "Thols" (Dileepan) (Abi & Usha's friend and Menaka's brother and Chellamma's son) (01-1533)
Ajay Kapoor as Adithya "Aadhi" Eshwaramoorthy (Eshwaramoorthy and Kanchana's first son and Arjun & Anjali's brother and Anu's cousin, Usha's husband and Kailash's father, Abi's younger step-brother and MD of Aditya Builders; Main Antagonist) (206-1527)
Abhishek Shankar as Baskar Narayanan (Abhinaya's ex-husband and Sangeetha's husband, suicides at the end) (02-1530)

Recurring cast

Production

Casting
V. Thiruselvam had some casting choices for the female lead, but B. Srinivasan preferred to cast a film artist for the female lead as he had already informed Sun TV. Initially actress Soundarya was about to do the female lead. Although she was interested, she was unable to join the crew due to her 2-month contract with the Bharatiya Janata Party to support them during election campaign. Then Devayani was suggested for the female lead by the production side to the director to which he had agreed as she would perfectly fit into the character and she was already acting in films. Initially Devayani had some issues over the terms and conditions agreement with the production side, as a result she almost opted out of this series. 
As a result of even considering Kousalya to do the female lead from the production side. But, Sathyapriya who was signed to play the mother of the female lead (Abinaya) managed to convince Devayani to play the female lead in this series and sorted out the misunderstanding between her and the production side. Apart from such issues, Devayani was very interested after listening to the script from her husband Rajakumaran to whom the director had already narrated and he had also praised the director. So, she signed to play the female lead Abinaya. Devayani made her acting debut in television with this series. Actress & Dubbing artist Deepa Venkat who is very well known for playing supporting roles in many serials & movies & lead roles in few serials was signed to play the female lead Usha.
 
Besides Manjari Vinodhini, Abhishek Shankar, Ajay Kapoor, Poornima Indrajith, Chandra Lakshman, Devadarshini, Kalpana Shree, Sathyapriya, Nalini, Mohan Sharma, Subhalekha Sudhakar, Viji Chandrasekhar, Vanitha Krishnachandran, Srilekha Rajendran, Kuyili, Bombay Gnanam, Shanmugasundari, Vijayasarathy, Vishwa, Yugendran, Ponvannan, Dwarakish Giri, Vijayaraj, Auditor Sridhar, Ramachandran, Joker Thulasi, Thozhar. La. Ve. Aadhavan, Sreedharan Gopal, Srividya, Revathi Priya, Pooja, Geetha Ravishankar, Bharathi, Keerthana, Preethi Sanjeev, Zia, Shyam Viswanathan, Devaraj, Deepa Narendra, Tinku, Divyadarshini, Akila, Dev Anand, Neelima Rani, G. V. Vijesh and many other artists were cast and introduced in this series.

Along with writing story, screenplay and directing the series, V. Thiruselvam was also cast as the male lead Tholkappiyan.

Filming
The series was filmed in Chennai, Kodaikanal, Palani, Thambirankanal, Koranattukarupur, Thiruvidaimarudur, Rameswaram, Thangachimadam, Dhanushkodi, Kolli Malai, Ponkurichi, Tirunelveli, Sundarapandiapuram, Courtallam, Chengalpattu, Walajapet, Yercaud, Tirukoilur, Mamallapuram, Kanchipuram, Porur, Poonamallee, Karayanchavadi, Thiruverkadu, Velappanchavadi, Tambaram, Pallavaram, Covelong, Panaiyur, Avadi, Parangimalai, Kovur, Injambakkam, Nerkundram, Madambakkam, Amarambedu, Sriperumbudur, Thiruperumbudur, Kundrathur, Puducherry, Kochi, Alappuzha, Thiruvananthapuram, Perandoor, Thammanam, Bangalore, Manchanabele, Mysore, Magadi and Bangarupalem in India.

Soundtrack

Title song
It was written by lyricist Palani Bharathi, composed by the music director D. Imman. It was sung by Harini.

Dubbed Version

Remakes

Awards and nominations

Reception
Kolangal was one of the highest-rated Indian and Tamil soap opera which garnered ratings ranging between 23 and 26 TVR. Between 20 December 2004 to 13 January 2005 it had a rating of 25.68 TVR. In September 2007, it maintained its top position with 21.58 TVR.

The show was initially aired on night 7.30 pm however in 2005 it was later shifted to 9 pm as the previous series Muhurtham received poor response among audience.

See also
 List of programs broadcast by Sun TV (India)

References

External links
 Official Website 

Sun TV original programming
2003 Tamil-language television series debuts
2009 Tamil-language television series endings
Tamil-language television shows